The Lone Tree Community School District, or Lone Tree Schools, is a rural public school district headquartered in Lone Tree, Iowa.

The Elementary, Middle, and High School are all located in one building on Main Street in Lone Tree.   Their rival in sports is neighboring school Highland.

The district is mostly in Johnson County, with a small area in Louisa County, and serves Lone Tree and the surrounding rural areas.

History
In 2018, the Lone Tree administration announced that the district will begin sharing a superintendent with the Highland Community School District.

Schools
The district operates two schools in a single facility in Lone Tree:
 Lone Tree Elementary School
 Lone Tree Junior-Senior High School

Lone Tree High School

Athletics
The Lions compete in the Southeast Iowa Superconference in the following sports:
Cross Country
Volleyball
Football
1985 Class A State Champions
Wrestling
Basketball
Boys 1982 Class A State Champions
Bowling
Track and Field
 Boys 1985 Class 1A State Champions
Golf
Soccer
Baseball
Softball

See also
List of school districts in Iowa
List of high schools in Iowa

References

External links
 Lone Tree Community School District

Education in Johnson County, Iowa
Education in Louisa County, Iowa
School districts in Iowa